The Tevis Block, also known as the Kern County Land Company Building, is a historic office building in Bakersfield, California.  The structure was placed on the National Register of Historic Places (NRHP) on March 29, 1984.

Structure

The Tevis Block is a two-story, U-shaped structure constructed of imported fire brick. The front, south-facing facade has fanlight windows and terra cotta arches. Each floor is articulated differently and treated with a different order and finish. Basement windows are rectangular and bottom-hinged with a flat lintel. The first floor windows, two-sash and divided vertically with the fanlight transom, are enhanced by the brickwork to give the appearance of including mezzanine windows. The second-story windows are single-light sash with flat radiating bricks above. Atop the second-story windows is a narrow frieze with square vents topped by a decorated boxed cornice capped by a high plain cornice. The rear of the building includes an enclosed elevator, added later, and a second-story, iron-railed walkway.

Significance
The Tevis Block is the final vestige of the Kern County Land Company.  The company was formed in 1890 by James Haggin and his brother-in-law Lloyd Tevis and prospered in developing Kern County, California areas around the Kern River.  The building helped open up the Bakersfield downtown west of H Street and became a landmark upon construction.  It was one of only a handful of unreinforced masonry buildings to survive the 1952 Kern County earthquake, and was subsequently strengthened, renovated and restored to a close proximity of its original architecture.  It is considered a fine example of Second Renaissance Revival architecture.

See also
California Historical Landmarks in Kern County, California
National Register of Historic Places listings in Kern County, California

References

Buildings and structures in Bakersfield, California
Commercial buildings completed in 1893
Commercial buildings on the National Register of Historic Places in California
National Register of Historic Places in Kern County, California